The United States sent a delegation to compete at the 2000 Summer Paralympics in Sydney, Australia. The United States finished fifth in the gold medal count and third in the overall medal count.

Medalists

The following American athletes won medals at the games.

See also 
 2000 Summer Paralympics
 United States at the 2000 Summer Olympics

References

External links
International Paralympic Committee Official Website
United States Paralympic Committee Official Website

Nations at the 2000 Summer Paralympics
2000
Paralympics